Algernon Percy, 1st Earl of Beverley FSA (21 January 1750 – 21 October 1830), styled Lord Algernon Percy between 1766 and 1786 and known as the Lord Lovaine between 1786 and 1790, was a British politician who sat in the House of Commons from 1774 to 1786 when he succeeded to the Peerage.

Background and education
Born Algernon Smithson, he was the second son of Hugh Percy, 1st Duke of Northumberland, and his wife, Lady Elizabeth Seymour, only daughter of Algernon Seymour, 7th Duke of Somerset. He was the brother of Hugh Percy, 2nd Duke of Northumberland, and the half-brother of James Smithson. He was educated at Eton.

Public life
In 1774, Percy was elected MP for Northumberland. He was elected MP for both Northumberland and Bere Alston in 1780, and chose to continue sitting for Northumberland. In 1786, he left the Commons when he inherited his father's barony of Lovaine (a title which was created for his father with a special remainder to pass to Algernon as a second son). He was created Earl of Beverley, in the County of York, in 1790.

Family
Lord Beverley married Isabella Burrell, second daughter of Peter Burrell and sister of Peter Burrell, 1st Baron Gwydyr, in 1775. Their children were:
Lady Charlotte Percy (1776–1862), married the 3rd Earl of Ashburnham and had issue.
Elizabeth Percy (1777–1779), buried within the Northumberland Vault in Westminster Abbey.
George Percy, 5th Duke of Northumberland (1778–1867)
Algernon Percy (1779–1833), diplomat.
(stillborn) (1781)
Lady Elizabeth Susan Percy (1782–1847), known as Susan / Lady Susan Percy, a watercolourist who lived in Italy during the 1830s.
Hugh Percy (1784–1856), later Bishop of Rochester and Carlisle.
Josceline Percy (1784–1856), naval commander.
Henry Percy (1785–1825), army officer, served in 7th Regiment of Foot 1804 then 14th Dragoons. Captured 1812 during retreat from Burgos and detained in France until 1814. ADC to Sir John Moore between 1808–9 in Peninsular War, and ADC to the Duke of Wellington in 1815. Carried the Waterloo Dispatch from the battlefield and delivered it to the Prince Regent at 16 St James's Square, London. MP for Brere Alson 1820–1825. Died aged 39 on 15 April 1825, unmarried but with two illegitimate children by Marion Durand, a French woman he met while a prisoner of war in France, Major-General Sir Henry Marion Durand and Percy Durand. Sir Henry Durand's son was created Baronet in 1892.
Lady Emily Charlotte Percy (1786–1877), married Andrew Mortimer Drummond. They had one son, and four daughters.
William Henry Percy (1788–1855), politician and naval commander.
Francis John Percy (1790–1812), army officer.
Lord Charles Greatheed Bertie Percy (1794–1870), granted, with his sister, Emily, the rank of a duke's daughter/younger son in 1865.
Lady Louisa Margaret Percy (1796–1796), buried within the Northumberland Vault in Westminster Abbey.

Lord Beverley died in October 1830, aged 80, and was succeeded by his eldest son, George, who later inherited the dukedom of Northumberland from his cousin, the 4th Duke, in 1865.

References

Sources
 Burke's Peerage & Gentry

1750 births
1830 deaths
People educated at Eton College
British MPs 1774–1780
British MPs 1780–1784
British MPs 1784–1790
Earls in the Peerage of Great Britain
Fellows of the Society of Antiquaries of London
Algernon Percy, 01st Earl of Beverley
Percy, Lord Algernon
Percy, Algernon